{{DISPLAYTITLE:C12H19N}}
The molecular formula C12H19N (molar mass: 177.29 g/mol) may refer to:

 N,α-Diethylphenethylamine
 2,6-Diisopropylaniline
 Isopropylamphetamine
 Propylamphetamine